Andrew Terblanche du Plessis (born ) is a South African rugby union player who last played for the  in the Currie Cup and the  in the Rugby Challenge. His regular position is hooker.

References

1995 births
Living people
Rugby union hookers
Rugby union players from Welkom
Sharks (Currie Cup) players
South African rugby union players